Let's Put It All Together is the fourth studio album recorded by American R&B group The Stylistics, released in May 1974 on the Avco label. It was produced by Hugo & Luigi and recorded at Mediasound Studios in New York City. This was the group's first album recorded outside of Philadelphia.

History
The album reached #14 on the Billboard 200, their highest ever position on that chart, and #4 on the R&B albums chart. "You Make Me Feel Brand New", which originally appeared in a five-minute version on their previous album, Rockin' Roll Baby, was included in an edited version. This version was released as a single and became a huge hit, reaching #2 on the Billboard Hot 100 and the UK Singles Chart. It also peaked at #5 on the R&B singles chart and #6 on the Easy Listening chart. The title track was also successful, peaking at number #18 on the Billboard Hot 100, their last big hit on that chart, #8 on the R&B singles chart, and #9 on the UK Singles chart. The Hugo & Luigi tracks were arranged and conducted by Van McCoy.

The song "Love Is the Answer" was sampled in E-40's song "Show Me What You Workin' Wit" featuring Too Short, taken from his 2010 album Revenue Retrievin': Night Shift and also received disco treatment as an eight minute instrumental by Van McCoy on a 12-inch record paired with "That Old Black Magic" by The Softones.

Track listing

Personnel
Russell Thompkins, Jr. – lead vocals
Airrion Love – backing vocals, co-lead vocals on "We Can Make It Happen", "You Make Me Feel Brand New" and "Doin' the Streets"
James Smith, Herb Murrell, James Dunn – backing vocals
Van McCoy – arranger, conductor

Charts

'''Singles

References

External links
 

1974 albums
The Stylistics albums
Albums produced by Hugo & Luigi
Albums produced by Thom Bell
Avco Records albums